Tamás Szamosi (born 27 November 1974 in Budapest, Hungary) is a Hungarian defender who playing for Szigetszentmiklósi TE. His former teams are Nea Salamina, III. Kerületi TUE, MTK Hungária FC and Zalaegerszegi TE.

External links
 

1974 births
Living people
Hungarian footballers
Hungary international footballers
Hungarian expatriate footballers
MTK Budapest FC players
Zalaegerszegi TE players
Nea Salamis Famagusta FC players
Pécsi MFC players
Szigetszentmiklósi TK footballers
Nemzeti Bajnokság I players
Cypriot First Division players
Association football defenders
Expatriate footballers in Cyprus
Footballers from Budapest